Tang Koreh (also known as Kohreh and Rashīdābād) is a village in Jolgah Rural District, in the Central District of Jahrom County, Fars Province, Iran. At the 2006 census, its population was 302, in 72 families.

References 

Populated places in Jahrom County